David Warner is an Australian international cricketer and former captain of the Australian national team in limited overs cricket. A left-handed opening batsman, Warner is well-known for his "aggressive" batting style. , he has scored 45 centuries25 in Tests, 19 in One Day Internationals (ODIs) and 1 in Twenty20 Internationals (T20Is)for the national team.

Warner made his Test debut against New Zealand in December 2011 and scored his first century (123 not out) in the second match of the series held at the Bellerive Oval. He carried the bat in the fourth innings of the match, which Australia lost by seven runs. He followed that with a 69-ball century in the third match of the home series against India in January 2012. It was the joint-fourth fastest in terms of balls faced at the time. In January 2017, while playing against Pakistan at the Sydney Cricket Ground, he became the fifth cricketerand the first in Australiato score a century before lunch on the first day of a Test match. His highest score of 335 not out was made against Pakistan at the Adelaide Oval in November 2019. Warner is one of three batsmen to score centuries in both innings of a Test match on three occasions. In December 2022, he scored 200 in his hundredth Test match, becoming the second Australian to score a century in his hundredth Test, and the second overall to score a double century. Among all countries, Warner has scored the most centuries (five) against Pakistan.

Warner scored his first ODI century in 2012, three years after his debut; he made 163 against Sri Lanka in the first of three finals of the 2011–12 Commonwealth Bank Series. His 178 against Afghanistan in the 2015 World Cup is the highest score by an Australian in the tournament's history. The following year, he scored seven centuries, including a career-highest total of 179 against Pakistan. His six scores in excess of 150 in ODIs is second only to India's Rohit Sharma's eight. Warner scored a man of the match innings of 89 in his T20I debut against South Africa in January 2009. His highest score in the format of 100 not out was made against Sri Lanka at the Adelaide Oval in October 2019.

Key
 *  Remained not out
   Man of the match

Test centuries

One Day International centuries

Twenty20 International centuries

Notes

References

Warner,centuries
Warner, David